Aenictus grandis is a species of dark brown army ant found in Bangladesh, Myanmar, and Yunnan.

References

Dorylinae
Hymenoptera of Asia
Insects described in 1903